The Co-Optimists is a 1929 British concert musical film directed by Edwin Greenwood and Laddie Cliff and starring Davy Burnaby, Stanley Holloway and Betty Chester. It was made at Twickenham Studios.

Production background
The film consists of excerpts from the stage musical of the same name which was devised by Davy Burnaby in 1921. The Co-Optimists consisted of a troupe of actors and singers and became largely successful by touring seaside resorts throughout England.

The show opened in London on 21 June 1921 and closed on 4 August 1927. The film was produced by Gordon Craig Productions and was directed by Laddie Cliff (who also starred in the film) and Edwin Greenwood. This film also provided Stanley Holloway with his second film appearance having been with the troupe from the start.

In December 1926, co-star Betty Chester appeared in a short film made in the DeForest Phonofilm sound-on-film process, singing the song 'Pig-Tail Alley' from the show.

Cast
Davy Burnaby
 Laddie Cliff
Melville Gideon
 Gilbert Childs
Stanley Holloway
 Phyllis Monkman
 Betty Chester
 Elsa MacFarlane
 Peggy Petronella
 Harry S. Pepper

Critical response
Hal Erickson of All Movie Guide noted that the revue had recently finished its U.S. run at the time of this film's release. He criticized the film for its stagy presentation. He stated that the film was poorly received by the critics, although Burnaby as master of ceremonies was praised.

References

External links
Answers.com
IMDB
NYTimes Movies
BFI Database entry
CITWF entry
MyProducer entry
The Filter entry
OV Guide entry
Fandango
Blockbuster
Starpulse

1929 films
Films directed by Edwin Greenwood
British black-and-white films
Films shot at Twickenham Film Studios
Concert films
1929 musical films
British musical films
British documentary films
1929 documentary films
1920s English-language films
1920s British films